The Avoyelles Journal is a free independent weekly newspaper serving Avoyelles Parish, Louisiana, United States. It is published on Sundays and has  circulation of around 17,000. It is headquartered in Marksville, Louisiana with one branch in Bunkie, Louisiana. It began publication in 1978, founded by Randy DeCuir. In 1986 it added a Wednesday advertising edition with business news In recent years, a website was begun to complement the newspaper: www.avoyellestoday.com. The newspaper sponsors the annual Avoyellean of the Year award which honors a local citizen who has made notable contributions to the parish of Avoyelles.

As of 1999, the paper was based in a 19th-century building, formerly the "Jules Coco Store".

References

External links 

Avoyelles Parish, Louisiana
Newspapers published in Louisiana
Newspapers established in 1978
1978 establishments in Louisiana
Marksville, Louisiana